Northowram is in the ward of Northowram and Shelf in the metropolitan borough of Calderdale, West Yorkshire, England.  It contains 32 listed buildings that are recorded in the National Heritage List for England.  Of these, five are at Grade II*, the middle of the three grades, and the others are at Grade II, the lowest grade.  The ward contains the village of Northowram, and areas to the west extending to the eastern boundary of Halifax, and includes the settlements of Shibden, Stump Cross and Claremount.  Most of the listed buildings are houses, cottages and associated structures, farmhouses, and farm buildings.  The other listed buildings include churches, a public  house, an underground bath house, a slab wall, a former textile mill converted into flats, and a boundary stone.


Key

Buildings

References

Citations

Sources

Lists of listed buildings in West Yorkshire